"Lean Back" is a song by American hip hop group Terror Squad. It was released as the second single from their second studio album, True Story, on June 1, 2004. An uptempo hip hop song built for the club environment, it features Fat Joe with Remy Ma handling the second verse. It topped the US Billboard Hot 100 for three weeks, starting on August 21, 2004, and topped the Billboard Hot R&B/Hip-Hop Singles & Tracks chart for seven weeks. Worldwide, the song reached the top 20 in several other countries, including Denmark, where it peaked at number five.

Music video
Fat Joe described the dance in the video as throwing back the right shoulder to the beat of the song. The video features cameos from DJ Khaled, N.O.R.E., Tego Calderon, Tony Sunshine, Kevin Hart, and Lil Jon, as well as the production-duo Cool & Dre.

Critical reception
Jason Birchmeier of AllMusic called the song "a perfect club-ready duet between Joe and Remy Ma that boasts a trademark Scott Storch beat and a memorable singalong hook and dance-along step". Vibe called the song a "summer classic". In 2008, the song was ranked at number 55 on VH1's "100 Greatest Songs of Hip Hop".

Remixes
The official remixed version of the song, featuring Lil Jon, Eminem, and Mase is available on Fat Joe's 2005 album All or Nothing and Lil Jon's Crunk Juice remix disc. The official remix is more uptempo and contains a new beat with a crunk–like feel to it. However, there are two different versions of the remix. The All or Nothing version, the main remix, features an additional verse by Remy Ma and was released in July 2004. The Crunk Juice version features Lil Jon's vocals throughout the song, omitting Remy Ma's verse. On both versions, Mase's verse is in line with his then-clean style of rapping (as heard on Welcome Back).

Fat Joe also released a remix in tribute to his Puerto Rican ancestry, featuring Tego Calderon and Tony Touch. Other remixes of the song are performed by Chamillionaire, in The Mixtape Messiah titled "Body Rock", Lil Wayne, Max B, Jadakiss, U.S.D.A., and G-Unit. Also, mashup artist Girl Talk layered "Lean Back" over Spacehog's "In the Meantime" in his album All Day. Houston rapper Lil' Flip did a freestyle over the song as a diss towards Atlanta rapper T.I.

Track listings

US 12-inch single
A1. "Lean Back" (clean) – 4:12
A2. "Lean Back" (instrumental) – 4:12
B1. "Lean Back" (dirty) – 4:11
B2. "Lean Back" (acappella) – 4:01

UK 12-inch single
A1. "Lean Back" (explicit) – 4:07
B1. "Yeah Yeah Yeah" – 3:07
B2. "Lean Back" (instrumental) – 4:12

UK and Australian CD single
 "Lean Back" (clean) – 4:11
 "Lean Back" (explicit) – 4:07
 "Yeah Yeah Yeah" – 3:07
 "Lean Back" (video)

European CD single
 "Lean Back" – 4:07
 "Yeah Yeah Yeah" – 3:07

Charts

Weekly charts

Year-end charts

Decade-end charts

Certifications

Release history

See also
 List of Billboard Hot 100 number-one singles of 2004
 List of number-one R&B singles of 2004 (U.S.)

References

2004 singles
2004 songs
Billboard Hot 100 number-one singles
Fat Joe songs
Hip hop dance
Island Records singles
Music videos directed by Jessy Terrero
Novelty and fad dances
Song recordings produced by Scott Storch
Songs written by Fat Joe
Songs written by Remy Ma
Songs written by Scott Storch
SRC Records singles
Tego Calderón songs
Terror Squad (group) songs
Universal Records singles